Kableshkovo may refer to:

Bulgaria
Kableshkovo, Dobrich Province, village
Kableshkovo, Kardzhali Province, village
Kableshkovo, Pomorie Municipality, town

Greece
Kableshkovo, Bulgarian name of Thourio, Evros